The fencing competitions at the 2017 Southeast Asian Games in Kuala Lumpur were held at MATRADE Exhibition and Convention Centre in Segambut.

The 2017 Games feature competitions in six individual events (3 events for each gender).

Events
The following events will be contested:
Épée
Individual
Foil
Individual
Sabre
Individual

Schedule

Participation

Participating nations

Medal summary

Medal table

Medalists

References

External links
  

2017
2017 Southeast Asian Games events
2017 in fencing